Shaanxi Chang'an Athletic Football Club is a professional Chinese football club that currently participates in the China League One. The team is based in Xi'an, Shaanxi.

History
Shaanxi Chang'an Athletic was founded on 30 March 2016 by co-raise funds of eight companies based in Xi'an and the name of the ancient capital and the name of the city it is based before it is changed to Xi'an. They played in the 2016 China Amateur Football League and won the winners of 2016 Shaanxi Provincial Super League and the first place of northwest region final–group A successively. Shaanxi Chang'an Athletic finished the runners-up in the national finals after losing Dalian Boyang in the penalty shoot-out but won promotion to 2017 China League Two. The team was third place in the 2018 China League Two, though losing to Meizhou Meixian Techand F.C. in the relegation play-offs, the team was promoted to the China League One due to the financial problem of the Yanbian Funde F.C. With the club within the second tier the Shaanxi Water Affairs Group Co., Ltd. would become the clubs majority shareholder.

Players

Current squad

Out on loan

Coaching staff

Managerial history
  Huang Hongyi (2016–2017)
  Zhao Changhong (2018)
  Xie Yuxin (2018)
  Zhang Jun (2019)
  Wang Bo (2019)
 Kim Bong-gil (2019–)

Results
All-time league rankings

As of the end of 2019 season.

Key
 Pld = Played
 W = Games won
 D = Games drawn
 L = Games lost
 F = Goals for
 A = Goals against
 Pts = Points
 Pos = Final position

 DNQ = Did not qualify
 DNE = Did not enter
 NH = Not Held
 – = Does Not Exist
 R1 = Round 1
 R2 = Round 2
 R3 = Round 3
 R4 = Round 4

 F = Final
 SF = Semi-finals
 QF = Quarter-finals
 R16 = Round of 16
 Group = Group stage
 GS2 = Second Group stage
 QR1 = First Qualifying Round
 QR2 = Second Qualifying Round
 QR3 = Third Qualifying Round

References

Football clubs in China
Association football clubs established in 2016
Sport in Shaanxi
2016 establishments in China